1941 is a year.

1941 may also refer to:

 1941 (film), a 1979 period comedy film by Steven Spielberg
 1941: Counter Attack, a 1990 video game
 1941 (EP), a 2001 EP by Soul-Junk
 "1941", a song from the 1967 album Pandemonium Shadow Show by Harry Nilsson
 1491s, a Native American sketch comedy group